Eastleigh Works is a locomotive, carriage and wagon building and repair facility in the town of Eastleigh, in the county of Hampshire in England.

History

LSWR
The London and South Western Railway (LSWR) opened a carriage and wagon works at Eastleigh in 1891. In 1903, the Chief Mechanical Engineer, Dugald Drummond, oversaw the construction of a large motive power depot in the town; replacing the existing maintenance and repair shops at Northam, Southampton. In January 1910, locomotive building was likewise transferred to the new workshops at Eastleigh from Nine Elms in London.

Among the locomotives produced by the LSWR under Drummond at Eastleigh, were the S14 0-4-0 and M7 0-4-4 tank engines, the P14 and T14 4-6-0, and D15 4-4-0, classes. Following the appointment of Robert Urie as Chief Mechanical Engineer in 1912, the works were responsible for the construction of the H15, S15, and N15 (King Arthur) 4-6-0 classes, and the G16 4-8-0, and H16 4-6-0 tank engines.

Southern Railway

Following the merger of the LSWR and other railways in southern England to form the Southern Railway, as part of the Railways Act grouping of 1923, Eastleigh was to become the principal works for the new railway. The new Chief Mechanical Engineer, Richard Maunsell re-organised the works and directed the design and construction of various new classes.

Like most of the railway works, Eastleigh was heavily involved in the war effort, producing, in 1938, sets of parts to convert Blenheim bombers so that they could be used as fighters. The works was also part of a joint venture with other workshops, railway and private, to produce Horsa gliders for the D-Day airborne assault. With Lancing works, it turned out 200 tail units. It also produced 1,500 anti-tank gun barrels and, with Brighton railway works, 240 multiple rocket launchers, plus landing craft, fuel tenders and harbour launches.

Under the Southern Railway, the works were responsible for building the Maunsell SR Lord Nelson Class 4-6-0, the Schools 4-4-0, U1 2-6-0, W class 2-6-4 tanks, and Q class 0-6-0 locomotives. Under the regime of Oliver Bulleid, after 1937, Eastleigh works constructed all thirty of the SR Merchant Navy Class and six of the West Country 4-6-2. During the Second World War, Eastleigh works built 23 examples of the London Midland and Scottish Railway designed 8F 2-8-0s. By the end of 1947, the works had built 304 locomotives with a further 16 before steam locomotive building ceased in 1950.

In 1945, the carriage works began constructing all-steel carriages, both electric and steam hauled. It pioneered the use of plastics and glass fibre reinforced resin for doors, seating and roof sections.

British Rail
In 1950, following the nationalisation of the Southern Railway to form the Southern Region of British Railways new steam locomotive building ceased at Eastleigh. However the works were kept fully occupied between 1956 and 1961 in rebuilding over 90 of the Bulleid 4-6-2 classes. Thereafter the works gradually changed over to steam and diesel repairs.

In 1962, the works was again reorganised with the carriage works site being sold, and carriage and electric multiple unit repairs transferred to the main locomotive works. In 1962, Eastleigh Works built the first six electro-diesel locomotives of British Rail Class 73 but the remainder of the class were built at the Vulcan Foundry.

Post privatisation
As part of the privatisation of British Rail, the plant was acquired from British Rail Engineering Limited through a management buyout in June 1995 and rebranded Wessex Traincare. In 1998 it was sold to Alstom and renamed Alstom Wessex Traincare. The site was used for carriage and multiple unit repairs. In 2004, Alstom announced the works were to close due to lack of work, which took effect in March 2006 after the completion of a contract to refurbish Class 455s for Southern.

The  site has been managed since 2002 by St. Modwen Properties; with the site being lease to several sub tenants including Knights Rail Services and Arlington Fleet Services.  , the site's facilities include overhead cranes, third rail electricity supply, paint facility, and refuelling facility. Additionally Siemens undertook maintenance of its South West Trains Class 444 and Class 450s on site, and Network Rail MPVs were stored on site.

In January 2018 KPI Property Investments who are jointly owned by St Modwen Properties and Salhia Real Estate sold the works to the corporate pension fund clients of Savills in a £20 million deal.

Knights Rail Services

In 2007 Knights Rail Services (KRS) began operations on site, using it to store off lease rolling stock, as well as undertake repairs and refurbishments. It removed asbestos from withdrawn London Underground A60, A62 and 1967 stock. In January 2012, KRS signed an extended lease on the site to 2016. In September 2012, KRS was purchased by co-tenant Arlington Rail Services.

Arlington Fleet Group
Arlington Fleet Group is based at the site with and is composed of Arlington Rail Services providing storage facilities, Arlington Fleet Services providing repair and maintenance of railway rolling stock and Arlington Fleet Workshops providing paint shop facilities. It started in 2004 when Arlington Fleet Services Ltd was established by a group of railway engineering professionals to perform rail vehicle maintenance including heavy repair. In September 2012 Arlington took control of the work and various activities from KRS becoming the dominant site tenant. By 2014 the works was again nearly fully occupied and Arlington extended its lease of the works until 2019.

Locomotive Depot

Adjacent to the locomotive works was a very large 15-road engine shed which was opened in 1903 and closed in 1967. This depot was one of the largest on the SR: in 1946 its allocation was 131 engines of extraordinary variety in age and origin:- 17 4-6-0, 31 4-4-0, 7 2-6-0, 19 0-6-0, 15 0-4-2, 1 0-8-0T, 13 0-6-0T, 23 0-4-4T and 5 0-4-0T. Although closed as a TMD, the site was used for scrapping engines as late as 2003.

References

Literature
 Aves, W.A.T., (2004) 'The locomotives built at the Southern Railway Works, 1- Eastleigh', Locomotives Illustrated, 255.
 Boocock, Colin and Stanton, Peter (2006) An illustrated history of Eastleigh Locomotive Works, Hersham: Oxford Publishing Co.
 Eagles, Barry J. (2002) Eastleigh: steam centre of the South Western, Settle: Waterfront
 Hawkins, Chris and Reeve, George (1979) An historical survey of Southern sheds, Oxford: Oxford Publishing Co.
 Larkin, E.J. and Larkin, J.G. (1988) The Railway Workshops of Great Britain 1823–1986, Macmillan Press
 Simmons, J., (1986) The Railway in Town and Country, Newton Abbot: David and Charles
 Winkworth, Bob (2007) Eastleigh: the railway, the town, the people, Southampton: Noodle Books

External links

 Knights Rail Services Official Website (archived at Wayback Machine)
 Arlington Fleet Group Official Website

Railway workshops in Great Britain
London and South Western Railway
Southern Railway (UK)
Eastleigh
Rail transport in Hampshire